Alive Again is the fourth full-length studio album by the Swedish rock band Nightingale.

Subtitled "The Breathing Shadow, Part IV", it is the last album completely devoted to The Breathing Shadow story.

This is the first release with Erik Oskarsson and Tom Björn in the band.

Alive Again continues the hard rock/AOR direction of the band's previous two albums, with poppier vocals and progressive arrangements.

Track listing
"Recollections" – 2:09
"Shadowman" – 5:03
"The Glory Days" – 4:16
"Falling" – 3:25
"Into the Light" – 3:58
"Eternal" – 11:21
"State of Shock" – 3:07
"The One" – 3:47
"Shadowland Serenade" – 5:54
"Forever and Never" – 6:23

Credits
Nightingale
 Dan Swanö : lead vocals, guitar
 Dag Swanö : backing vocals, guitar, keyboard
 Erik Oskarsson : backing vocals, bass guitar
 Tom Björn : drums

References

Nightingale (band) albums
2003 albums
The End Records albums